Cold Spring Harbor Laboratory Press was founded in 1933 to aid in Cold Spring Harbor Laboratory's purpose of furthering the advance and spread of scientific knowledge.

CSHL Press publishes monographs, technical manuals, handbooks, review volumes, conference proceedings, scholarly journals and videotapes. These examine important topics in molecular biology, genetics, development, virology, neurobiology, immunology and cancer biology. Manuscripts for books and for journal publication are invited from scientists worldwide.

Revenue from sales of CSHL Press publications is used solely in support of research at Cold Spring Harbor Laboratory.

Journals

Scientific journals published by CSHL Press:
 Cold Spring Harbor Molecular Case Studies
 Cold Spring Harbor Perspectives in Biology
 Cold Spring Harbor Perspectives in Medicine
 Cold Spring Harbor Protocols
 Cold Spring Harbor Symposia on Quantitative Biology
 Genes & Development
 Genome Research
 Learning & Memory
 Life Science Alliance
 RNA

Monographs 
The Cold Spring Harbor Press monograph series is a series of advanced comprehensive volumes giving the state of the  art on the most important model organisms and systems for research in molecular biology. The series began in  1970 with  The Lactose Operon edited by David Zipser and Jonathan Beckwith

Operation centers
CSHL Press has two operation centers. The main office is located in Woodbury, New York, near Cold Spring Harbor Laboratory, where editorial, marketing & advertising, composition, and fulfillment & distribution functions are performed. An additional book fulfillment & distribution operation is handled by NBN International in Plymouth, United Kingdom. Its current executive director is John R. Inglis.

References

External links
 
 Cold Spring Harbor Monographs

Book publishing companies based in New York (state)
Publishing companies established in 1933
1933 establishments in New York (state)
Academic publishing companies
American companies established in 1933